The 2013 Canoe Sprint European Championships were the 25th edition of the Canoe Sprint European Championships, an international canoe and kayak sprint event organised by the European Canoe Association, and the 15th edition since its revival in 1997. They were held for the first time in Portugal, at the Center for High Performance in Montemor-o-Velho, between 14 and 16 June 2013. As in the previous edition, the competition comprised 26 events, of which 16 were for men and 10 for women.

Medal overview

Men

Women

Paracanoe

Medal events
 Non-Paralympic classes

Medal table
Medals:

Canoe

Para Canoe
Results:

References

External links
 Official website
 European Canoe Association

Canoe Sprint European Championships
Canoe Sprint European Championships
European Sprint Championships
Canoeing in Portugal